The United Nations Mission to Investigate Allegations of the Use of Chemical Weapons in the Syrian Arab Republic was a United Nations fact-finding mission to investigate possible use of chemical weapons in Syria. The mission was established by the U.N. Secretary-general Ban Ki-moon on 21 March 2013 to investigate the 19 March 2013 Khan al-Assal chemical attack that was brought to the Secretary-general's attention by the Syrian Government. On 27 March 2013, the secretary-general appointed Åke Sellström to head the mission. The mission had an OPCW component headed by Scott Cairns and a WHO component headed by Maurizio Barbeschi.

On 16 September 2013, the mission published a report with focus on the Ghouta chemical attack that occurred on 21 August 2013. The next day, Åke Sellström and his team, answered questions about the report on a press conference. On 12 December 2013, the mission delivered its final report to the U.N. Secretary-General Ban Ki-moon.

The mission investigated 7 of 16 alleged chemical attacks:
 2012-10-17 Salquin (also spelled Salqin)
 2012-12-23 Homs
 2013-3-13 Darayya
 2013-3-19 Khan al-Assal (also spelled Khan al-Asal)
 2013-3-19 Otaybah
 2013-3-24 Adra
 2013-4-12 to 4-14 Jobar
 2013-4-13 Sheikh Maqsood
 2013-4-25 Darayya
 2013-4-29 Saraqeb (also spelled Saraqib)
 2013-5-14 Qasr Abu Samrah
 2013-5-23 Adra
 2013-8-21 Ghouta
 2013-8-22 Bahhariyeh (also spelled al-Bahariyah)
 2013-8-24 Jobar
 2013-8-25 Ashrafiah Sahnaya (also spelled Ashrafiyat Sahnaya)

Normal text indicates that the mission did not find sufficient or credible information to further investigate the alleged chemical attacks.

Bold text indicates that the mission decided to further investigate the attack.

See also
 Independent International Commission of Inquiry on the Syrian Arab Republic
 Use of chemical weapons in the Syrian civil war

References

Organizations established by the United Nations
International reactions to the Syrian civil war
Chemical weapons in the Syrian civil war
Syria and the United Nations